A root (or root word) is the core of a word that is irreducible into more meaningful elements. In morphology, a root is a morphologically simple unit which can be left bare or to which a prefix or a suffix can attach. The root word is the primary lexical unit of a word, and of a word family (this root is then called the base word), which carries aspects of semantic content and cannot be reduced into smaller constituents.
Content words in nearly all languages contain, and may consist only of, root morphemes. However, sometimes the term "root" is also used to describe the word without its inflectional endings, but with its lexical endings in place. For example, chatters has the inflectional root or lemma chatter, but the lexical root chat. Inflectional roots are often called stems, and a root in the stricter sense, a root morpheme, may be thought of as a monomorphemic stem.

The traditional definition allows roots to be either free morphemes or bound morphemes. Root morphemes are the building blocks for affixation and compounds. However, in polysynthetic languages with very high levels of inflectional morphology, the term "root" is generally synonymous with "free morpheme". Many such languages have a very restricted number of morphemes that can stand alone as a word: Yup'ik, for instance, has no more than two thousand.

The root is conventionally indicated using the mathematical symbol √; for instance, the Sanskrit root "" means the root "".

Examples
The root of a word is a unit of meaning (morpheme) and, as such, it is an abstraction, though it can usually be represented alphabetically as a word. For example, it can be said that the root of the English verb form running is run, or the root of the Spanish superlative adjective amplísimo is ampli-, since those words are derived from the root forms by simple suffixes that do not alter the roots in any way. In particular, English has very little inflection and a tendency to have words that are identical to their roots. But more complicated inflection, as well as other processes, can obscure the root; for example, the root of mice is mouse (still a valid word), and the root of interrupt is, arguably, rupt, which is not a word in English and only appears in derivational forms (such as disrupt, corrupt, rupture, etc.). The root rupt can be written as if it were a word, but it is not.

This distinction between the word as a unit of speech and the root as a unit of meaning is even more important in the case of languages where roots have many different forms when used in actual words, as is the case in Semitic languages. In these, roots (semitic roots) are formed by consonants alone, and speakers elaborate different words (belonging potentially to different parts of speech) from the root by inserting different vowels. For example, in Hebrew, the root ג-ד-ל g-d-l represents the idea of largeness, and from it we have gadol and gdola (masculine and feminine forms of the adjective "big"), gadal "he grew", higdil "he magnified" and magdelet "magnifier", along with many other words such as godel "size" and migdal "tower".

Roots and reconstructed roots can become the tools of etymology.

Secondary roots

Secondary roots are roots with changes in them, producing a new word with a slightly different meaning. In English, a rough equivalent would be to see conductor as a secondary root formed from the root to conduct. In abjad languages, the most familiar of which are Arabic and Hebrew, in which families of secondary roots are fundamental to the language, secondary roots are created by changes in the roots' vowels, by adding or removing the long vowels a, i, u, e and o. (Notice that Arabic does not have the vowels e and o.) In addition, secondary roots can be created by prefixing (m−, t−), infixing (−t−), or suffixing (−i, and several others). There is no rule in these languages on how many secondary roots can be derived from a single root; some roots have few, but other roots have many, not all of which are necessarily in current use.

Consider the Arabic language:
 مركز [mrkz] or [markaza] meaning ‘centralized (masculine, singular)’, from [markaz] ‘centre’, from [rakaza] ‘plant into the earth, stick up (a lance)’ ( ر-ك-ز | r-k-z).
 أرجح [rjh] or [ta'arjaħa] meaning ‘oscillated (masculine, singular)’, from ['urju:ħa] ‘swing (n)’, from [rajaħa] ‘weighed down, preponderated (masculine, singular)’ ( ر-ج-ح | r-j-ħ).
 محور [mhwr] or [tamaħwara] meaning ‘centred, focused (masculine, singular)’, from [mihwar] meaning ‘axis’, from [ħa:ra] ‘turned (masculine, singular)’ (ح-و-ر | h-w-r).
 مسخر [msxr], تمسخر [tamasxara] meaning ‘mocked, made fun (masculine, singular)', from مسخرة [masxara] meaning ‘mockery’, from سخر [saxira] ‘mocked (masculine, singular)’ (derived from س-خ-ر[s-x-r])." Similar cases may be found in other Semitic languages such as Hebrew, Syriac, Aramaic, Maltese language and to a lesser extent Amharic.

Similar cases occur in Hebrew, for example Israeli Hebrew  √m-q-m ‘locate’, which derives from Biblical Hebrew  måqom ‘place’, whose root is  √q-w-m ‘stand’. A recent example introduced by the Academy of the Hebrew Language is  midrúg ‘rating’, from  midrág, whose root is  √d-r-g ‘grade’."

According to Ghil'ad Zuckermann, "this process is morphologically similar to the production of frequentative (iterative) verbs in Latin, for example:
 iactito ‘to toss about’ derives from iacto ‘to boast of, keep bringing up, harass, disturb, throw, cast, fling away’, which in turn derives from iacio ‘to throw, cast’ (from its past participle iactum).

Consider also Rabbinic Hebrew  √t-r-m ‘donate, contribute’ (Mishnah: T’rumoth 1:2: ‘separate priestly dues’), which derives from Biblical Hebrew  t'rūmå ‘contribution’, whose root is  √r-w-m ‘raise’; cf. Rabbinic Hebrew  √t-r-' ‘sound the trumpet, blow the horn’, from Biblical Hebrew  t'rū`å ‘shout, cry, loud sound, trumpet-call’, in turn from  √r-w-`."
and it describes the suffix.

Category-neutral roots 
Decompositional generative frameworks suggest that roots hold little grammatical information and can be considered "category-neutral". Category-neutral roots are roots without any inherent lexical category but with some conceptual content that becomes evident depending on the syntactic environment. The ways in which these roots gain lexical category are discussed in Distributed Morphology and the Exoskeletal Model.

Theories adopting a category-neutral approach have not, as of 2020, reached a consensus about whether these roots contain a semantic type but no argument structure, neither semantic type nor argument structure, or both semantic type and argument structure.

In support of the category-neutral approach, data from English indicates that the same underlying root appears as a noun and a verb - with or without overt morphology.

In Hebrew, the majority of roots consist of segmental consonants √CCC.  Arad (2003) describes that the consonantal root is turned into a word due to pattern morphology. Thereby, the root is turned into a verb when put into a verbal environment where the head bears the "v" feature (the pattern).

Consider the root √š-m-n (ש-מ-נ).

Although all words vary semantically, the general meaning of a greasy, fatty material can be attributed to the root.

Furthermore, Arad states that there are two types of languages in terms of root interpretation. In languages like English, the root is assigned one interpretation whereas in languages like Hebrew, the root can form multiple interpretations depending on its environment. This occurrence suggests a difference in language acquisition between these two languages. English speakers would need to learn two roots in order to understand two different words whereas Hebrew speakers would learn one root for two or more words.

Alexiadou and Lohndal (2017) advance the claim that languages have a typological scale when it comes to roots and their meanings and state that Greek lies in between Hebrew and English.

See also

 Lemma (morphology)
 Lexeme
 Morphological typology
 Morphology (linguistics)
 Phono-semantic matching
 Principal parts
 Proto-Indo-European root
 Radical (Chinese character) (this is more based upon a writing system than a spoken language)
 Semitic root
 Word family
 Word stem

References

External links 
 Virtual Salt Root words and prefixes
 Espindle - Greek and Latin Root Words

Lexical units
 
Linguistics terminology